The 2007 Amílcar Cabral Cup was held in Bissau, Guinea Bissau at the Estádio Nacional 24 de Setembro and Estádio Lino Correia from 30 November until 10 December 2007. The winner was Mali, which beat Cape Verde 2-1 to win the tournament.

Group stage

Group A

Group B

Knockout stage

Semi-finals

After the draw in 90', they immediately went into penalty shootout. No extra time was played.

Third place match

Final

Match was abandoned at 0–0 in 30' due to power failure.

Awards
 Best player: Souleymane Dembélé (Mali)
 Best goal keeper: Fock (Cape Verde)
 Top scorer: Meïssa Binta Ndiaye (Senegal)
 Best referee: Ousmane Karambé (Mali)

Sources
 rsssf.com results

2007
2007 in African football
Amil